Idiomarina woesei is a Gram-negative and heterotrophic bacterium from the genus of Idiomarina which has been isolated from seawater from the Andaman Sea in India.

References

Bacteria described in 2015
Alteromonadales